Roger Gregoire (13 December 1903 – 11 November 1982) was a French racing cyclist. He rode in the 1928 Tour de France.

References

1903 births
1982 deaths
French male cyclists
Place of birth missing